The Ephippigerini are a tribe of bush crickets in the subfamily Bradyporinae, erected by Brunner von Wattenwyl in 1878.  Species have been recorded from mainland Europe (not the British Isles or Scandinavia), North Africa and the Horn of Africa.

Genera 
The Orthoptera Species File lists:
 Afrosteropleurus Barat, 2012
 Albarracinia Barat, 2012 - monotypic Albarracinia zapaterii (Bolívar, 1877)
 Baratia Llucià Pomares, 2021 - monotypic Baratia sari Llucià Pomares, 2021
 Baetica Bolivar, I., 1903 - monotypic Baetica ustulata (Rambur, 1839)
 Callicrania Bolívar, 1898
 Coracinotus Barat, 2012
 Corsteropleurus Barat, 2012 - monotypic Corsteropleurus chopardi (Rungs, 1952)
 Ephippiger Berthold, 1827
 Ephippigerida Bolivar, 1903
 Lluciapomaresius Barat, 2012
 Lucasinova Barat, 2012 - monotypic Lucasinova nigromarginata (Lucas, 1849)
 Neocallicrania Pfau, 1996
 Parasteropleurus Barat, 2012
 Platystolus Bolivar, I., 1878
 Praephippigera Bolivar, 1903
 Sabaterpia Barat, 2012
 Sorapagus Barat, 2012 - monotypic Sorapagus catalaunicus (Bolívar, 1898)
 Steropleurus Bolivar, 1878
 Synephippius Navás, 1905 - monotypic Synephippius obvius (Navás, 1904)
 Uromenus Bolivar, 1878

References

External links 

Orthoptera of Europe
Orthoptera of Africa
 Orthoptera tribes
Bradyporinae